Ernest Gébler (31 December 1914 – 26 January 1998), sometimes credited as Ernie Gebler, was an Irish writer of Czech origin. He was a member of Aosdána.

Early life
Gébler was born in Dublin, one of the five children of Adolf (or Adolphe) Gébler, a shopkeeper and musician of Czech Jewish origin who had married a Dublin theatre usherette. The family moved to Wolverhampton in 1925. In 1930 Adolf got a job with a Dublin light opera company and Ernest followed the rest of the family there in 1931. Ernest worked backstage in the Gate Theatre in the 1930s.

Later career
After his writing career took off with his first novel in 1946, Gébler enjoyed greater success with his novel The Plymouth Adventure (1950), which was made into a Hollywood film. He was first married to Leatrice Gilbert (1924–2015), daughter of the actors John Gilbert and Leatrice Joy, whom he met in Hollywood; he was Leatrice's fourth husband. The couple moved to Ireland, got married and had a son John Karl (called Karl by Ernest but John by his mother). They were divorced in 1952, and mother and baby returned to America.

In Dublin in 1952 Gébler met future novelist Edna O'Brien, then working in a pharmacist's shop. After opposition from O'Brien's family, they moved to England, married in 1954, and made their home at Lake Park House, overlooking Lough Dan, in Co Wicklow. They had two sons, Karl (later Carlo) and Sasha, who became respectively a writer and an architect. The house was sold in 1955 to the poet Richard Murphy. It was Gébler who introduced O'Brien to her first publisher, Iain Hamilton of Hutchinson. and her literary career eclipsed Gébler's after her début novel The Country Girls in 1960.

The couple separated in 1964 and divorced in 1968, with O'Brien eventually gaining sole custody of the children. Both O'Brien and Carlo Gébler later wrote about Ernest's cruelty to the family. Gébler returned to Dublin in 1970, but also owned farmland near Lough Owel, and became friendly with his neighbour J. P. Donleavy.

After a fall at home, Gébler was taken into care and his house in the Dublin suburb of Dalkey was sold. He spent the last seven years of his life at Grove Nursing Home in Killiney, Dublin, where he died in 1998 of a bronchial infection, after several years with Alzheimer's disease. He was 83.

Works

References

Footnotes

Sources

Citations

Further reading
 Carlo Gébler: **The projectionist : the story of Ernest Gébler'', Stillorgan, County Dublin, Republic of Ireland : New Island Books, 2015,

External links
 
 

1914 births
1998 deaths
21st-century Irish people
Aosdána members
Irish television writers
20th-century Irish novelists
20th-century Irish male writers
Irish screenwriters
Irish dramatists and playwrights
Writers from Dublin (city)
People of Czech-Jewish descent
Irish people of Czech descent
Deaths from bronchitis
Irish people of Jewish descent
Male television writers
20th-century screenwriters